

Season summary 
Juventus and Trapattoni's ways got distance each other, with the coach taken from Internazionale and Rino Marchesi called to replace him. Reigning champion tried to retain domestic title, but met in Napoli a difficult opponent. European hopes were stopped in autumn, due to shoot-out loss against Real Madrid.

The following Sunday, Juventus was also beaten by partenopei. They proved to be a stronger team than bianconeri, defeating them even in retour match. Marchesi managed, eventually, to reach second place thank Inter's stop in last game. It also signed Platini's retirement, announced from him after Juventus-Brescia.

Squad

Goalkeepers
  Stefano Tacconi
  Luciano Bodini

Defenders
  Luciano Favero
  Sergio Brio
  Gaetano Scirea
  Nicola Caricola
  Roberto Soldà
  Antonio Cabrini
  Stefano Pioli

Midfielders
  Lionello Manfredonia
  Massimo Mauro
  Massimo Bonini
  Michael Laudrup
  Beniamino Vignola
  Ivano Bonetti
  Marco Bruzzano

Attackers
  Michel Platini
  Aldo Serena
  Massimo Briaschi
  Renato Buso

Competitions

Serie A

League table

Matches

Coppa Italia 

First round

Eightfinals

Quarterfinals

European Cup

First round

Second round

References

Juventus F.C. seasons
Juventus